Room for Abuse is the second full-length album by the Tewkesbury ska punk band Spunge. It was released on 9 October 2000 on Sucka-Punch Records, and recorded at DEP International Studios, Birmingham (the studio owned by UB40).

Two singles were released from the album, "Ego" and "Live Another Day" (which was a double A-side with a new version of "Kicking Pigeons" from their Pedigree Chump album). "No Woman No Cry" is a cover of the famous Bob Marley song, to which the Marley family officially gave Spunge permission to change the lyrics. "Santeria" is a cover of the Sublime song.

Track listing
 "Live Another Day" – 4:04
 "Get Along" – 2:31
 "Break Up" – 3:44
 "No Woman No Cry" – 4:25
 "All Gone Wrong" – 3:30
 "Dubstyle" – 4:18
 "Wake Up Call" – 2:58
 "Disco Kid" – 4:08
 "All She Ever Wants" – 5:26
 "Ego" – 3:04
 "Second Rate" – 3:12
 "Nothing to Hide" – 4:02
 "Go Away" – 3:18
 "Rockabilly" – 3:23
 "Santeria" – 3:47
 "Room for Abuse" – 5:07

References

2000 albums
Spunge albums